Nick Cave and the Bad Seeds are an Australian rock band from Melbourne. Formed by eponymous vocalist Nick Cave and multi-instrumentalist Mick Harvey after the breakup of The Birthday Party in August 1983, the original lineup of the group also included German guitarist Blixa Bargeld and English bassist Barry Adamson. The band's first tour, later in the year, featured guitarist Hugo Race in place of Bargeld (who was touring with Einstürzende Neubauten) and bassist Tracy Pew (also formerly of The Birthday Party), the latter of whom left early the next year. They released their debut album From Her to Eternity in June 1984. Race left later in the year, although performed as a guest on several Bad Seeds releases later. The group continued briefly as a four-piece, releasing The Firstborn Is Dead in June 1985.

Shortly after the release of the band's second album, Thomas Wydler joined as the new drummer for Bad Seeds, with Harvey moving to focus primarily on guitar and keyboards. Two albums followed in 1986 – Kicking Against the Pricks and Your Funeral... My Trial –
the latter of which featured Adamson on only two tracks, having recently left. Harvey took over on bass, with Kid Congo Powers joining on guitar and keyboardist Roland Wolf also joining. Tender Prey was released in 1988, before Wolf was dismissed the next year due to personality conflicts with Cave. The 1990 follow-up The Good Son was also the last Bad Seeds album for Powers, who left later in the year. Harvey took over from Powers on guitar, as bassist Martyn P. Casey and keyboardist Conway Savage joined to expand the group to a six-piece.

The lineup of Nick Cave and the Bad Seeds remained stable throughout the 1990s, save for two additions. First was second drummer and percussionist Jim Sclavunos, who joined in 1994 during the promotional tour for Let Love In. Second was violinist and multi-instrumentalist Warren Ellis, who became an official members of the group in 1997 after having featured as a session and touring musician. In March 2003, founding member Bargeld left the Bad Seeds in order to "concentrate on other creative areas in [his] life", describing his departure as "nothing to do with artistic or personal differences with the band". The guitarist was replaced by James Johnston, who had previously toured briefly with the group in 1994. Johnston remained a member of the group until after the release of Dig, Lazarus, Dig!!! in 2008.

On 22 January 2009, it was announced that Harvey, the last remaining original member of the Bad Seeds besides Cave, had left the band in order to pursue other projects. He was replaced for shows later in the year by Ed Kuepper. After a brief hiatus, the band returned in 2013 with Push the Sky Away, during which time Barry Adamson returned to the band on drums and keyboards, filling in for Wydler who was absent to illness. Kuepper briefly toured with the group again, before being replaced later by George Vjestica. Adamson remained until early 2015, when Wydler returned to touring and keyboards were taken over by Larry Mullins (also known as Toby Dammit). Savage was forced to leave the touring group in early 2017 after being diagnosed with a brain tumour. He died the following September.

Members

Current

Former

Touring

Timeline

Lineups

References

External links
Nick Cave and the Bad Seeds official website

Nick Cave and the Bad Seeds